Grant E. "Gene" Riegle (June 3, 1928 – October 17, 2011) was an American harness racing driver and trainer. He was inducted into the Harness Racing Hall of Fame in 1992.

Riegle started his harness racing career in 1950. His father, Roy Riegle, was also a driver and trainer. Roy Riegle and his wife were killed in a 1957 auto accident.

At the 1972 Little Brown Jug, Riegle drove Jay Time who was the odds on favorite before the race. Jay Time, who finished in a dead heat with Strike Out one month earlier in the Adios Pace, was scratched after the first heat due to a high temperature.

During the 1981 Woodrow Wilson Pace held at Meadowlands Raceway, Riegle was thrown from his sulky while driving Andre Hanover in the process of trying to avoid a fallen horse. He suffered minor abrasions. 1992 Harness racing horse of the year, Artsplace, was trained by Riegle.

In 1990, Riegle along with Bruce Nickells, were awarded the Glen Garnsey Trophy as United States Trainer of the Year.

Riegle trained 1993 Little Brown Jug winner, Life Sign.

Riegle died at his Greenville, Ohio home on October 17, 2011.

References

External links
Gene Riegle at Harness Racing Museum & Hall of Fame

1928 births
2011 deaths
American harness racers
Dan Patch Award winners
People from Greenville, Ohio
United States Harness Racing Hall of Fame inductees
Sportspeople from Ohio